Alophoixus is a genus of songbird in the bulbul family, Pycnonotidae found in south-eastern Asia.

Taxonomy and systematics

Extant species
Up to 2009, all the extant species of the genus Alophoixus were classified within the genus Criniger. Currently, there are eight species recognized:

 Yellow-bellied bulbul (Alophoixus phaeocephalus)
 Palawan bulbul (Alophoixus frater)
 Grey-cheeked bulbul (Alophoixus tephrogenys)
 Penan bulbul (Alophoixus ruficrissus)
 Brown-cheeked bulbul (Alophoixus bres)
 White-throated bulbul (Alophoixus flaveolus)
 Ochraceous bulbul (Alophoixus ochraceus)
 Puff-throated bulbul (Alophoixus pallidus)

Former species
Formerly, some authorities also considered the following species (or subspecies) as species within the genus Alophoixus:
 Seram golden bulbul (as Alophoixus affinis)
 Northern golden bulbul (as Alophoixus longirostris)
 Sangihe golden bulbul (as Alophoixus platenae)
 Togian golden bulbul (as Alophoixus aureus)
 Halmahera golden bulbul (as Alophoixus chloris)
 Obi golden bulbul (as Alophoixus lucasi)
 Buru golden bulbul (as Alophoixus mystacalis)
 Finsch's bulbul (Alophoixus finschii, now Iole finschii)

References

 
Bird genera
Bulbuls
Taxa named by Eugene W. Oates
Taxonomy articles created by Polbot